Great Jewish Music: Serge Gainsbourg is a tribute album featuring the music of French singer/songwriter Serge Gainsbourg. Executive-produced by John Zorn, it was released on Tzadik Records in 1997 as part of their series on "Radical Jewish Culture".

Track listing
 "Les Amours Perdues" – Elysian Fields – 3:28
 "Ford Mustang" – Mike Patton – 2:40
 "Bonnie and Clyde" – Wayne Horvitz and Robin Holcomb – 5:08
 "La-Bas C'est Naturel" – Cyro Baptista – 5:30
 "69 Année Erotique" – Kramer – 4:16
 "Pauvre Lola" – Ikue Mori – 2:49
 "Ballade de Melody Nelson" – Fred Frith – 2:04
 "Les sucettes" – JON – 2:44
 "L'Homme A La Tête De Chou" – Ruins – 3:18
 "Ce Mortel Ennui" – Anthony Coleman – 4:10
 "Un Poison Violent, C'est Ca L'Amour" – Eszter Balint – 5:05
 "Initials B.B." – David Shea – 3:48
 "Sous Le Soleil Exactement" – Eyvind Kang – 3:44
 "Couleur Café" – Steve Beresford – 3:07
 "Le Chanson De Slogan" – Blonde Redhead – 3:46
 "Contact" – John Zorn – 2:20
 "Je t'aime... moi non plus" – Cibo Matto – 4:20
 "Intoxicated Man" – Medeski Martin & Wood – 3:31
 "Comic Strip" – Shelley Hirsch – 1:58
 "Requiem Pour Un Con" – Franz Treichler – 4:59
 "Black Trombone" – Marc Ribot – 3:45

Personnel

"Les Amours Perdues"
Oren Bloedow – Guitar, bass, drums
Ed Pastorini – Keyboards
Jamie Candiloro – Mixing
Jennifer Charles – Vocals
"Ford Mustang"
Mike Johnson – Engineering
Mike Patton – Vocals, Music
"Bonnie And Clyde"
Wayne Horvitz – Music
Tucker Martine – Mixing
Reggie Watts – Vocals
Robin Holcomb – Vocals
"La-Bas C'est Naturel"
Cyro Baptista – Percussion
Olivier Glissant – Vocals, Accordion
"69 Année Erotique"
Tess – Backing vocals
Kramer – Vocals, music
"Pauvre Lola"
Ikue Mori – Drum programming
Mark Roule – Engineering
Marc Ribot – Guitar
Haena Kim – Vocals
"The Ballad Of Melody Nelson"
Fred Frith – Vocals, music
"Les Sucettes"
JON – Vocals, Harmonium
"L'Homme A La Tête De Chou"
Sasaki Hisashi – Bass
Tatsuya Yoshida – Vocals, drums
"Ce Mortel Ennui"
Yael Bitton – Backing vocals
Doug Wieselman – Clarinet
Joe Johnson – Engineering
Michael Attias – Baritone saxophone
Anthony Coleman – Vocals, piano

"Un Poison Violent, C'est Ca L'Amour"
Roberto Rodríguez – Drums
Eddie Sperry – Engineering
Marc Ribot – Guitar, backing vocals
JD Foster – Producer, bass, organ
Eszter Balint – Vocals
"Initials B.B."
Kurt Ralske – Engineering
David Shea – Music
Tiziana Shea – Vocals
"Sous Le Soleil Exactement"
Eyvind Kang – Music
Michelle Amar – Vocals
"Couleur Café"
Steve Beresford – Vocals, Music
"Le Chanson De Slogan"
Simone Pace – Drums
Guy Picciotto – Engineering
Amadeo Pace – Guitar
Kazu Makino – Vocals
"Contact"
John Zorn – Vocals
"Je T'Aime, Moi Non Plus"
Sean Lennon – Bass, guitar, vocals
Timo Ellis – Drums, vocals
Yuka Honda – Keyboards
Miho Hatori – Vocals
"Intoxicated Man"
Chris Wood – Bass
Billy Martin – Drums
John Medeski – Organ, vocals
"Comic Strip"
Shelley Hirsch – Vocals
"Requiem Pour Un Con"
Tronte – Music, vocals
Franz Treichler – Music, vocals
"Black Trombone"
Eddie Sperry – Engineering
Marc Ribot – Guitar, vocals

Credits
Ikue Mori – Artwork
Serge Gainsbourg – Music
John Zorn – Producer
Allan Tucker – Mastering

Sources
 
 

1997 compilation albums
Tzadik Records albums
Pop compilation albums
Albums produced by John Zorn
Serge Gainsbourg tribute albums